Donika Emini is a Kosovan beauty pageant titleholder who was crowned as Miss Kosova Earth 2013 that gave her the right to represent Kosovo at Miss Earth 2013 pageant. She is the first Kosovan representative for Miss Earth from the said Fadil Berisha-Agnesa Vuthaj owned franchise.

Biography

Early childhood years
As published in Miss Earth's official website, Donika describes her childhood years as "grew up in a good family and social environment". She went to schools and participated as part of a choir, joined poetry and dance. Donika also mentions that travel is an important part of her childhood years as she was able to travel in almost all places in her country as well as in its neighboring countries.

Miss Kosova 2013
Donika joined the contest of Miss Kosova 2013. She won the title of Miss Kosova Earth 2013 together with Mirjeta Shala who won the title of Miss Universe Kosovo 2013.

Miss Earth 2013
Donika flew to the Philippines to take part in the Miss Earth 2013 pageant. She participated in all the pre-pageant activities but she was not able to get any medals as it was the basis of winning a particular activity. When the pageant concluded, Donika was not called to be part of the semi-finals where the Top 16 would advance to win the crown.

As a Miss Earth candidate, an environmental advocacy is a must. When asked about Donika's advocacy, she chooses water as her main concern. She says, "As environment is a broad subject I want to focus on water only. As it is well known Water is life! The main precondition for all the planet, including humans, animals and our economies. Climate regulation cycle is also heavily dependent on water! In addition, water is something that crosses national boundaries and therefore its protection is key to the planet and human life." Her project is all about water efficiency. The standardization of eco-toilet flushes is the best solution she thinks to make the water efficient. She supported it with a study that says, "only if only 10% of all toilets in the European Union were to be replaced, households across the EU could save nearly €390m and this would have significant impact on water savings and its efficiency." She is eyeing her hometown, Ferizaj, as the location of the birth of her project, targeting the newly build apartment buildings in the neighborhood to avoid the possible extra costs. She also says that the next level of her project is to "work towards changing national water policies and adopting legislation that makes it mandatory to standardize and make eco-toilet fleshes mandatory."

Donika promoted her country, Kosovo, by mentioning their country's "River Bifurcation". She describes Kosovo also as, "one of the most liberal countries in terms of religion tolerance. We are known for great hospitality and when visitors visit Kosovo, they always come back or find a way to stay here forever."

External links
Miss Earth Official Website
Miss Earth Kosovo 2013 Eco-Beauty Video
Donika Emini at Miss Earth Official Website

References

Kosovo Albanians
Living people
Miss Earth 2013 contestants
Kosovan beauty pageant winners
People from Pristina
Year of birth missing (living people)